The 2013 Úrvalsdeild karla (English: Men's Premier League), also known as the Pepsi-deild for sponsorship reasons, is the 102nd season of top-flight Icelandic football. Twelve teams will contest the league; the defending champions are FH, who won their sixth league title in 2012.

The fixtures for the 2013 campaign were released by the KSÍ on 10 November 2012, while the season is scheduled to run from 5 May until 28 September.

Teams
The 2013 Úrvalsdeild will be contested by twelve clubs, ten of which played in the division the previous season. The changes from the 2012 campaign are:
Grindavík and Selfoss were relegated from the 2012 Úrvalsdeild to the 2013 1. deild karla.
Þór A. and Víkingur Ó. were promoted from the 2012 1. deild karla to the 2013 Úrvalsdeild.

Club information

Iceland Map

League table

Results
Each team plays every opponent once home and away for a total of 22 matches per club, and 132 matches all together.

Top goalscorers

References

Úrvalsdeild karla (football) seasons
1
Iceland
Iceland